Proposition 73, the Parental Notification Initiative, would have amended the California Constitution to bar abortion on an unemancipated minor until 48 hours after physician notifies minor's parent/legal guardian, except in medical emergency or with parental waiver. The amendment permitted a judicial waiver of notice based on clear and convincing evidence of the minor's maturity or best interests. The minor's physician must report abortions performed on minors and State shall compile statistics. The amendment authorized monetary damages for violation. The minor must consent to abortion unless mentally incapable or in medical emergency. Permits judicial relief if minor's consent to abortion is coerced.

State official summary
Proposition 73: Termination of Minor's Pregnancy.  Waiting Period and Parental Notification.  Initiative Constitutional Amendment.

Ballot Summary
Amends California Constitution to bar abortion on unemancipated minor until 48 hours after physician notifies minor's parent/legal guardian, except in medical emergency or with parental waiver. However, the abortion can still be enacted by the minor with or without the parent's approval after the parents have been notified.  Permits judicial waiver of notice based on clear and convincing evidence of minor's maturity or minor's best interests.  Physician must report abortions performed on minors and State shall compile statistics.  Authorizes monetary damages for violation.  Minor must consent to abortion unless mentally incapable or in medical emergency.  Permits judicial relief if minor's consent to abortion is coerced.  Summary of estimate by Legislative Analyst and Director of Finance of fiscal impact on state and local governments:  The net costs of this measure to Medi-Cal and other programs are unknown, but are probably not significant in the context of the total expenditures for these programs.

Results
Did not pass
Yes: 3,676,592  (47.2%)
No: 4,109,430  (52.8%)

Endorsements

Video endorsements
Patrick Warburton
James Caviezel

Radio spots
Patricia Heaton
Dr. Laura Schlessinger
Ben Stein
Laura Ingraham
Robert Davi

Newspapers
Jim Holman, owner, San Diego Reader

References

External links
HealthVote.org: Non-partisan Information & Analysis about Proposition 73
VoteCircle.com Non-partisan resources & vote sharing network for Californians
Proposition 73: Parental Notification of Abortion, Institute of Governmental Studies Library
Yes on 73
Parent's Right To Know
Campaign for Teen Safety

73
Abortion referendums
Failed amendments to the Constitution of California
United States state abortion legislation
Initiatives in the United States
Women in California